Cody Grace (born 19 March 1996) is a professional Canadian football punter for the Calgary Stampeders of the Canadian Football League (CFL).

College career
Grace played college football for the Arkansas State Red Wolves from 2017 to 2019.

Professional career
Grace was drafted in the first round, seventh overall by the Calgary Stampeders in the 2021 CFL Global Draft and signed with the team on 11 May 2021. Following 2021 training camp, he won the job as the team's punter and played in his first career professional game on 7 August 2021, against the Toronto Argonauts. He played in 14 regular season games and had 78 punts with a 45.6-yard average. He was named a CFL Western All-Star at the end of the year and became the first Global player to win the award.

References

External links
 Calgary Stampeders bio

1996 births
Living people
American football punters
Arkansas State Red Wolves football players
Australian emigrants to Canada
Australian emigrants to the United States
Australian expatriate sportspeople in Canada
Australian expatriate sportspeople in the United States
Australian players of American football
Australian players of Canadian football
Calgary Stampeders players
Canadian football punters
Sportspeople from Perth, Western Australia